Matiwane (died c.1830, uMgungundlovu), son of Masumpa, was the chief of an independent Nguni-speaking tribe, the amaNgwane, a people named after Matiwane's ancestor Ngwane. The amaNgwane lived at the headwaters of the White Umfolozi, in what is now northern KwaZulu-Natal. The cunning of Matiwane would keep the amaNgwane one step ahead of the ravages of the rising Zulu kingdom, but their actions also set the Mfecane in motion. After his tribe was ousted from their homeland by Zwide or Shaka, Matiwane and his army preyed on neighboring tribes and became vagrant marauders. Eventually he fled South into lands occupied by Xhosa States, which got his whole tribe annihilated at the Battle of Mbholompo. As a refugee Matiwane was at the mercy of the Basutos and Swazis, but eventually had to seek refuge with king Dingane, successor to Shaka. This despotic ruler put Matiwane to death shortly after Matiwane sought his protection.

Migrations
Expecting an attack on his homeland, Matiwane moved some of his cattle herds westward. Soon afterwards, in 1817 or 1818, either Zwide or Shaka serving as Dingiswayo's general, attacked and plundered the amaNgwane and drove them across the Buffalo river. This was the onset of the Mfecane migrations in which tribes became displaced, and in turn displaced others in a series of internecine wars.

The destitute amaNgwane under Matiwane's leadership moved westwards, where they attacked the Hlubi, a larger kingdom built by Bhungane, in a quest to recover their cattle. Matiwane's patrols trapped and killed their chief Mthimkhulu c.1818, causing the Hlubi tribe to scatter in different directions. Some Hlubi abandoned their homeland and fled north or west, or joined Shaka, but some merged with the amaNgwane. Still others joined a coalition of refugees, the Fengu, who settled on the eastern frontier of the Cape Colony. The Hlubi rued this catastrophe, referring to it as the izwekufa ("country of death"), and ascribed it to an act of witchcraft.

For the next three to four years Matiwane became the overlord of the upper Thukela region, near present-day Bergville, as he incorporated smaller tribes like the Bhele (relations of the Hlubi) and Zizi.

In 1821 or 1822 Matiwane, expecting an attack from Shaka, fled over the Drakensberg and drove the Tlokwa tribe of chieftainess Mantatese (mother of Sekonyela) from their land in the Harrismith-Vrede region. Sotho tribes of the interior were also attacked, who fled to the region of Lesotho, where they joined the ranks of Moshoeshoe I. When Matiwane turned south and threatened Moshoeshoe I, he sought the protection of Shaka and sent him tribute. Matiwane established himself at Mabolela hill, near present day Clocolan, and Moshoeshoe complained to Shaka that this prevented him from sending tribute. Shaka dispatched Moselekatse (Mzilikazi) to attack Matiwane, who had to retreat before the impi's advance. They fled southwards to the lands of the abaThembu, which they once again plundered. They would however be defeated at the Battle of Mbholompo by the AmaMpondo who were led by Faku kaNgqungqushe and their Paramount, King Hintsa. Matiwane became a fugitive again in 1828, when his people were defeated by colonial troops under the command of Major Dundas and Colonel Somerset.

Death
Dingane allowed his residence on the Hlomo amabutho ridge, less than a kilometer from his royal kraal UMgungundlovu, but before long had him killed. Dingane posthumously appointed him as the "devil chief" and "great chief of the wicked", and had scores of his own enemies executed at KwaMatiwane, the Place of Matiwane.

References

1830s deaths
History of KwaZulu-Natal
Assassinated South African people
Year of birth missing
Mfecane